Indradhanussu is a 1979 Indian Malayalam film, directed by K. G. Rajasekharan.

Cast
 Prem Nazir as Gopi
 Jayabharathi as Sindhu
 Manavalan Joseph as Mathai
 K. P. Ummer as Menon
 T. R. Omana as Janakiyamma
 Balan K Nair as Mammad
 Sathaar as Inspector Nair
 Jose Prakash as Rappai
 Nellikode Bhaskaran as Govindan
 P. K. Abraham as Balan Mashu
 Pattom Sadan as Sankarankutty
 Kunchan as Kuttappan
 Sadhana as Annamma
 Janardhanan as Inspector Babu
 Priya as Nirmala

Soundtrack
lyrics :Chirayinkeezhu Ramakrishnan Nair
music :M.S. Viswanathan

References

External links

1979 films
1970s Malayalam-language films
Films scored by M. S. Viswanathan
Films directed by K. G. Rajasekharan